Zádor may refer to:

 Zádor, Hungary, a village in Hungary
 Zádor, Slovakia, a village in Slovakia